The Moneyweek (or Money Week), also known as Money Weekly, was a Chinese financial newspaper established on 23 July 2007 and headquartered in Guangzhou. It was a subsidiary weekly focusing on personal financial news, targeted at readers interested in stock markets, economic investment, and other topics.

Moneyweek was affiliated with the Southern Media Group and was an important member of the 21st Century Newspaper System.

History
Moneyweek was presented by the Southern Media Group on 23 July 2007.

In September 2014, various news collecting and editing staff of the newspaper were taken away for investigation.

On 30 April 2015, the publishing licence of Moneyweek was revoked.

References

Defunct newspapers published in China
2007 establishments in China
Publications disestablished in 2015
Publications established in 2007
Business newspapers published in China
Defunct weekly newspapers